Judge Browning may refer to:

James O. Browning (born 1956), judge of the United States District Court for the District of New Mexico
James R. Browning (1918–2012), judge of the United States Court of Appeals for the Ninth Circuit
William Docker Browning (1931–2008), judge of the United States District Court for the District of Arizona

See also
Justice Browning (disambiguation)